General Qadam Shah Shahim an Afghan diplomat and former army officer. He served as the Chief of Staff of the Afghan National Army from May 2015 to April 2017 before resigning amid political fallout over the 2017 Camp Shaheen attack.

Early life and education 
Shahim, an ethnic Tajik, was born in the Tashkan district of Badakhshan, in 1962 and attended Keshm High School, graduating in 1982.

Military career

Early military career 
From the early 1980s, Shahim fought with Jamiat-e Islami against the Soviets. He later fought against other mujahedin factions during the civil war, and then against the Taliban. In 1994, he was appointed as commander of 82 Regiment in Qargha, and in 1997 was made a Brigadier. In 2001, Shahim was commander of the 37th Brigade of Commandos and dealt often with foreign forces.

Late military career 
In 2007, he commanded the 1st Brigade of the 111st Capital Division, based in Kabul. In 2011, he was appointed as commander of the 111st Capital Division, which is half the size of a normal division. Shahim was wounded in the July 2014 attack on Kabul Airport and hospitalised in Sardar Mohammad Daoud Khan hospital for further treatment. In May 2015, he was appointed as Chief of the General Staff of the Afghan National Army. In August and September 2016, Shahim visited India in order to enhance ties with the Indian army and to seek new avenues for acquiring military equipment.

References 

1962 births
Afghan military personnel
Generals
Living people
Military personnel of the War in Afghanistan (2001–2021)
People from Badakhshan Province
Afghan military officers